Cooper Mountain runs southwest northeast through Hampshire County in West Virginia's Eastern Panhandle, rising to its greatest elevation of  above sea-level at Bens Knob. Cooper Mountain is flanked to its west by North River Mountain and to its east by Parks Valley and Dillons Run. The Northwestern Turnpike (U.S. Route 50) crosses Cooper Mountain at Loom between Hanging Rock and Capon Bridge. Tourists and travelers on U.S. Route 50 pull off at the Cooper Mountain overlook for the views over Parks Valley, Capon Bridge, and the ridges of Virginia.

Historical sites
 Cooper Mountain Stone Fountain, along US Route 50

Mountains of Hampshire County, West Virginia
Mountains of West Virginia
Northwestern Turnpike